The United States Revenue Act of 1916, (ch. 463, September 8, 1916) raised the lowest income tax rate from 1% to 2% and raised the top rate to 15% on taxpayers with incomes above $2 million ($ in  dollars). Previously, the top rate had been 7% on income above $500,000 ($ in  dollars). The Act also instituted the federal estate tax.

The entry of the United States into World War I greatly increased the need for revenue.

An excess profits tax was introduced and the modern estate tax was imposed.

The act was applicable to incomes for 1916.

Income Tax Table for Individuals 
A Normal Tax and an Additional Tax were levied against the net income of individuals as shown in the following table.

Exemption of $3,000 for single filers and $4,000 for married couples.

Notes

External links 
https://www.history.com/this-day-in-history/war-revenue-act-passed-in-u-s

United States federal taxation legislation
1916 in American law